Jdeidat Yabous (also spelled Jdeidet Yabous), previously known as Ainkania, is a village situated  west of Damascus, Syria.
According to the Syria Central Bureau of Statistics, the village had a population of 994 in the 2004 census.

The village sits in the hills, on the border between Syria and Lebanon where a checkpoint is operated between the two countries. Weapons have been seized at the checkpoint, being smuggled from Lebanon concealed in the floor of a truck, to arm rebels in the Syrian civil war.

There are seams of iron ore in the area.

Ain Qaniya spring and Roman temple
There is a spring and Roman temple in the area called Ain Qaniya or Ayn Qaniya. Julien Aliquot identified the ancient name of the village, which was previously called Ainkania after this spring. A study of the ancient settlement and sanctuary is currently in progress under Ibrahim Omeri. It has been suggested that the goddess Leucothea was worshiped at the temple, which sits in the north east of a group of Temples of Mount Hermon.

References

External links

Photo of Jdeidat Yabous bordergate on panoramio.com
Jdeidat Yabous on geographic.org
Jdeidat Yabous on mapmonde.org
Last Syrian checkpoint on wikimapia.org

Populated places in Qudsaya District
Archaeological sites in Rif Dimashq Governorate
Ancient Roman temples
Roman sites in Syria
Tourist attractions in Syria